Peter van Merksteijn Jr. (born 1 September 1982) is a Dutch racing driver and rally driver who will be driving for the Van Merksteijn Motorsport team in the 2011 World Rally Championship season. He won the Dutch Rally Championship in 2007 in the Group N class with a Mitsubishi Lancer Evolution IX. He made his WRC début in 2007 at the Rallye Deutschland. He is the son of Peter van Merksteijn Sr., who raced in the WRC before and won the 2008 24 Hours of Le Mans in the LMP2 class, using a Porsche RS Spyder.

Career

Early Career-2007
Van Merksteijn was born in Hengelo, Netherlands. He started his rallying career in 2006 with a Renault Mégane and entered in national events. With the help of his fathers team, Van Merksteijn Motorsport with team principal Gerard Grouve, he entered the 2007 Dutch Rally Championship with a Mitsubishi Lancer Evo IX. His co-driver was Francis Strikker for the start of the season but Eddy Chevaillier took Strikker's place and has been van Merksteijn's co-driver since. He won the 2007 season in the group N class.

In the same year, he made his WRC début at the 2007 Rallye Deutschland. He competed the rally with the Evo IX used in the Dutch Rally Championship. He finished the rally 70th overall. He also competed two other WRC events in the 2007 season, rallying in the 2007 Rally Catalunya, and used a Mitsubishi Lancer Evolution VIII for the 2007 Rally GB. He finished 29th overall in the Welsh-based round.

2008-onwards

2008 saw Van Merksteijn alter between a number of cars, the Evo VIII and IX's and a Ford Focus RS WRC 06. He also used an 07-spec Focus WRC for the final Dutch Rally Championship round. He only contested in two Dutch Rally rounds, finishing second in both rounds. He contested five WRC rounds in which he only finished one round, the 2008 Rallye Deutschland, finishing 17th overall which is currently his best finish in a WRC event.

2009 was a quiet season from Van Merksteijn. He entered in two Dutch events and two WRC events, finishing 18th at the 2009 Rally Norway and retired at the 2009 Rally de Portugal. In 2010 he equalled his best WRC of 17th at the 2010 Swedish Rally. It was the only rally he competed in 2010.

He is set to compete in the 2011 World Rally Championship season with Van Merksteijn Motorsport after originally been confirmed to rally for the Citroën Junior Team. He will be competing in all but three rounds in the next-generation Citroën DS3 WRC. He will be rallying alongside father and team owner Van Merksteijn Sr.

WRC results

References

External links

 Profile at vm-motorsport.nl
 Results at eWRC-results.com

1982 births
Living people
Sportspeople from Hengelo
Dutch rally drivers
World Rally Championship drivers